Atelographus sexplagiatus is a species of longhorn beetles of the subfamily Lamiinae. It was described by Melzer in 1927, and is known from southeastern Brazil.

References

Beetles described in 1927
Endemic fauna of Brazil
Acanthocinini